Dom Ferdinand II (Portuguese: Fernando II) (29 October 1816 – 15 December 1885) was a German prince of the House of Saxe-Coburg and Gotha-Koháry, and King of Portugal jure uxoris as the husband of Queen Maria II, from the birth of their first son in 1837 to her death in 1853.

In keeping with Portuguese law, only after the birth of his son in 1837 did he acquire the title of king. Ferdinand's reign came to an end with the death of his wife in 1853, but he served as regent for his son and successor, King Pedro V, until 1855.

He retained the style and title of king even after the death of Maria II and her succession by their children Pedro V and then Luís I. His sons were kings regnants, while Ferdinand himself was a king-father during their reigns.

Early life
Born Ferdinand August Franz Anton in Vienna, he was the eldest son of Prince Ferdinand of Saxe-Coburg-Saalfeld and his wife Princess Maria Antonia Koháry de Csábrág et Szitnya, heiress to the House of Koháry. The younger Ferdinand grew up in several places: the family estates in modern-day Slovakia, the imperial court of Austria, and Germany. He was a nephew of King Leopold I of Belgium, and thus a first cousin to Leopold II of Belgium and Empress Carlota of Mexico, as well as Queen Victoria of the United Kingdom and her husband Prince Albert. In 1826, his title changed from Prince of Saxe-Coburg-Saalfeld to Prince of Saxe-Coburg and Gotha, following the re-arrangement of the Saxon duchies.

King of Portugal

According to Portuguese law, the husband of a queen regnant could only be titled king after the birth of an heir from that marriage; this was the reason Maria II's first husband, Auguste de Beauharnais, Duke of Leuchtenberg, never acquired the title of king. After the birth of their eldest son and heir, the future Pedro V of Portugal, Ferdinand was proclaimed King Dom Fernando II.

Although it was Maria who reigned by right, the royal couple formed an effective team during their joint reign, with Ferdinand reigning by himself during his wife's pregnancies.

Eventually, Maria II died as a result of the birth of their eleventh child, and Ferdinand II's reign ended. However, he would assume the regency of Portugal from 1853 to 1855, during the minority of his son King Pedro V.

Later life

Ferdinand was an intelligent and artistically minded man with modern and liberal ideas. He was adept at etching, pottery and painting aquarelles. He was the president of the Royal Academy of Sciences and the Arts, Lord Protector of the University of Coimbra and Grand-Master of the Rosicrucians.

In 1838, he acquired the former Hieronymite monastery of Our Lady of Pena, which had been built by King Manuel I in 1511 on the top of the hill above Sintra and had been left unoccupied since 1834, when the religious orders were suppressed in Portugal. The monastery consisted of the cloister and its outbuildings, the chapel, the sacristy and the bell tower, which today form the northern section of the Pena National Palace (the "Old Palace").

Ferdinand began by making repairs to the former monastery, which, according to the historical sources of that time, was in poor condition. He refurbished the whole of the upper floor, replacing the fourteen cells used by the monks with larger-sized rooms and covering them with the vaulted ceilings that can still be seen today. In 1843, the king decided to enlarge the palace by building a new wing (the New Palace) with even larger rooms (one of them being the Great Hall), ending in a circular tower next to the new kitchens. The building work was directed by the Baron von Eschwege, a wild architectural fantasy in an eclectic style full of symbolism that could be compared with the castle Neuschwanstein of King Ludwig II of Bavaria. The palace was built in such a way as to be visible from any point in the park, which consists of a forest and luxuriant gardens with over five hundred different species of trees originating from the four corners of the earth. Ferdinand would spend his last years in this castle with his second wife, receiving the greatest artists of his time.

Marriages and descendants

In 1836 Ferdinand married Queen Maria II of Portugal. Eleven children were born to the royal couple before Maria died of complications due to childbirth in 1853. Ferdinand was destined to outlive eight of his eleven children. In late 1861, an attack of cholera or typhoid fever struck the royal family and Ferdinand suffered the tragedy of witnessing the death of three of his five surviving sons.

Later in his life, Ferdinand married again in Lisbon on 10 June 1869 to actress Elisa Hensler (Neuchâtel, 22 May 1836 – Lisbon, Coração de Jesus, 21 May 1929). Just before the marriage, she was styled Gräfin (Countess) von Edla by Ferdinand's cousin Ernest II, Duke of Saxe-Coburg and Gotha. The couple had no children.

Ancestry

Honours

Portuguese orders and decorations
 Grand Cross of the Sash of the Three Orders, 9 December 1835 – wedding gift of his bride, Queen Maria II
 Grand Cross of the Tower and Sword
 Grand Cross of the Immaculate Conception of Vila Viçosa
 Gold Medal of Distinguished Service

Foreign orders and decorations

Notes

|-

1816 births
1885 deaths
19th-century Portuguese monarchs
Burials at the Monastery of São Vicente de Fora
3
3
3
House of Braganza-Saxe-Coburg and Gotha
Jure uxoris kings
Knights Grand Cross of the Order of the Immaculate Conception of Vila Viçosa
Knights of the Golden Fleece of Spain
Nobility from Vienna
Portuguese Roman Catholics
Portuguese royal consorts
Princes of Saxe-Coburg and Gotha
Recipients of the Order of St. Anna, 1st class
Recipients of the Order of the White Eagle (Russia)
Regents of Portugal
Remarried royal consorts